Dennisiomyces is a genus of fungi in the family Tricholomataceae. Described by mycologist Rolf Singer in 1955, the genus contains five species found in South America.

The genus name of Dennisiomyces is in honour of Richard William George Dennis (1910 - 2003), British botanist (mycology) and plant pathologist.

See also

List of Agaricales genera
List of Tricholomataceae genera

References

Tricholomataceae
Agaricales genera
Taxa named by Rolf Singer